A cost object is a term used primarily in cost accounting to describe something to which costs are assigned. Common examples of cost objects are: product lines, geographic territories, customers, departments or anything else for which management would like to quantify cost.

Cost object is anything for which a separate measurement of cost is required. Cost object may be a product, a service, a project, etc.

The use of cost objects is common within activity based costing and Grenzplankostenrechnung systems.

See also
Cost centre (business)

References

Costs
Management accounting